Customization refers in the context of international marketing to a country-tailored product strategy which focuses on cross-border differences in the needs and wants of target customers, appropriately changing products in order for them to match local market conditions. Therein, customization follows a market-driven orientation (as opposed to a product-driven orientation) and aims at increasing customer satisfaction by adapting the company's products to local needs.

CUSTOMERization means identifying and serving what you perceive as your optimal customers. CUSTOMERization - Targeting Optimal Customers, R Craig Palubiak

References
ouojojojo

Sources

 Kotabe, M./Helsen, K. (2007): Global Marketing Management, 4th ed., New York: Wiley International Edition.
 Palubiak, R Craig, 1998, CUSTOMERization : Targeting Optimal Customers, Business Person's Handbook
 * emmanuel zvavamwe ,w .1999 /intersection of market customisation
Business terms